CFAB is a Canadian radio station broadcasting at 1450 AM in Windsor, Nova Scotia. The station currently airs a country format branded as AVR, and is owned & operated by the Maritime Broadcasting System. The station also airs a mix of locally produced programming and simulcasting of its sister station CKEN-FM from Kentville.

History
The station was launched on November 13, 1945 by Evangeline Broadcasting, and was acquired by Annapolis Valley Radio, which would eventually become the Maritime Broadcasting System, in 1979.

The station was given partial authorization by the Canadian Radio-Television and Telecommunications Commission to convert to the FM band in 2006, contingent on choosing a different frequency than its original application. Due to delays in locating a suitable frequency, this FM conversion has not yet taken place as of 2022. On November 20, 2008, the Commission approves an application by Maritime Broadcasting System Limited (Maritime) for an extension, until November 27, 2009.

However, on March 20, 2012, the Canadian Radio-Television and Telecommunications Commission administratively renewed the licence for CFAB to August 31, 2012. On August 28, the licence was administratively renewed to December 31, 2012. On December 19, the licence was renewed to August 31, 2019.

References

External links
 1450 CFAB
 
 

FAB
FAB
FAB
Radio stations established in 1945
1945 establishments in Nova Scotia